The 528th Air Defense Group  is a disbanded United States Air Force organization. Its last assignment was with the 4711th Air Defense Wing at Presque Isle Air Force Base, Maine. It was inactivated on 18 August 1955.  The group was originally activated as a support unit for the 97th Bombardment Group at the end of World War II in Italy.

The group was activated once again in 1953, when ADC established it as the headquarters for a dispersed fighter-interceptor squadron and the medical, maintenance, and administrative squadrons supporting it.  It was replaced in 1955 when ADC transferred its mission, equipment, and personnel to the 23d Fighter Group in a project that replaced air defense groups commanding fighter squadrons with fighter groups with distinguished records during World War II.

History

World War II
The group was first activated in Italy as the 528th Air Service Group about VE Day in a reorganization of Army Air Forces (AAF) support groups in which the AAF replaced Service Groups that included personnel from other branches of the Army and supported two combat groups with Air Service Groups including only Air Corps units.  Designed to support a single combat group. Its 954th Air Engineering Squadron provided maintenance that was beyond the capability of the combat group, its 778th Air Materiel Squadron handled all supply matters, and its Headquarters & Base Services Squadron provided other support. The group provided support for 97th Bombardment Group in Italy in 1945.  It was disbanded in 1948.

Cold War

The group was reconstituted during the Cold War, redesignated as the 528th Air Defense Group, and activated at Presque Isle Air Force Base, Maine in 1953 with responsibility for air defense of Northeastern US.  The 529th was assigned the 74th Fighter-Interceptor Squadron (FIS), which was already stationed at Presque Isle flying cannon armed and airborne intercept radar armed Lockheed F-94 Starfires as its operational component. The 74th FIS had been assigned directly to the 4711th Defense Wing. The group also replaced the 85th Air Base Squadron as USAF host organization at Presque Isle.  it was assigned three squadrons to perform its support responsibilities.

In March, the 57th FIS, flying Northrop F-89 Scorpions was activated at Presque Isle as the group's second operational squadron. In June, the 74th FIS also converted to Scorpions. The 74th FIS moved to Greenland and was reassigned away from the group in August 1954. A few days earlier, in a swap of units, the 318th FIS had moved from Greenland and was reassigned to the group to replace the 74th FIS. Upon arrival at Presque Isle, the 318th FIS converted to newer model Scorpions armed with Mighty Mouse rockets.  A second swap of units began when the 82d Fighter Interceptor Squadron arrived from Iceland the same day the 74th FIS left, and also converted to "Scorpions". The 57th FIS then moved to Iceland and was reassigned away from the group in November of the same year. The group was inactivated and replaced by the 23d Fighter Group (Air Defense) in 1955 as result of Air Defense Command's Project Arrow, which was designed to bring back on the active list the fighter units which had compiled memorable records in the two world wars. Disbanded once again in 1984.

Lineage
 Constituted as 528th Air Service Group
 Activated on 18 May 1945
 Inactivated on or about 18 October 1945
 Disbanded on 8 October 1948
 Reconstituted and redesignated as: 528th Air Defense Group on 21 January 1953
 Activated on 16 February 1953
 Inactivated on 18 August 1955
 Disbanded on 27 September 1984

Assignments
 Unknown (probably XV Air Force Service Command), 18 May 1945 – 1945
 4711th Defense Wing (later 4711th Air Defense Wing), 15 February 1953 – 18 August 1955

Stations
 Amendola, Italy, 18 May 1945 – 1945
 Presque Isle Air Force Base, Maine, 15 February 1953 – 18 August 1955

Components

Operational Squadrons
 57th Fighter-Interceptor Squadron, 27 March 1953 – 12 November 1954
 74th Fighter-Interceptor Squadron, 16 February 1953 – 21 August 1954
 82d Fighter Interceptor Squadron, 21 August 1954 – 18 August 1955
 318th Fighter Interceptor Squadron, 8 August 1954 – 18 August 1955

Support Units
 528th Air Base Squadron, 16 February 1953 – 18 August 1955
 528th Materiel Squadron, 16 February 1953 – 18 August 1955 included base flight and aero repair
 528th Medical Squadron (later 528th USAF Infirmary), 16 February 1953 – 18 August 1955
 778th Air Materiel Squadron, 18 May 1945 – 1945
 954th Air Engineering Squadron, 18 May 1945 – 1945

Aircraft
 Northrop F-89C Scorpion, 1953–1954
 Northrop F-89D Scorpion, 1954–1955
 Lockheed F-94B Starfire, 1953, 1954

See also
 Aerospace Defense Command Fighter Squadrons
 F-89 Scorpion units of the United States Air Force
 F-94 Starfire units of the United States Air Force

References

Notes

Bibliography

 Buss, Lydus H.(ed), Sturm, Thomas A., Volan, Denys, and McMullen, Richard F., History of Continental Air Defense Command and Air Defense Command July to December 1955, Directorate of Historical Services, Air Defense Command, Ent AFB, CO, (1956)

Further reading
 Grant, C.L., (1961)  The Development of Continental Air Defense to 1 September 1954, USAF Historical Study No. 126

External links

0528
Aerospace Defense Command units
Military units and formations disestablished in 1984
Military units and formations established in 1953